Speaking Parts is a 1989 Canadian drama film directed by Atom Egoyan. It earned a Best Motion Picture nomination, and five other nominations, at the 1989 Genie Awards. It was also nominated for Gold Hugo in 1989 Chicago International Film Festival, and won Best Canadian Screenplay in Vancouver International Film Festival.

Plot 
Speaking Parts involves a struggling, bit-part actor Lance (Michael McManus), whose job as a hotel custodian is a front for his real job as a gigolo by his female supervisor (Patricia Collins). A female co-worker Lisa (Arsinée Khanjian) is obsessed with him, but he avoids her. Meanwhile, Lisa's obsession with Lance has led her to rent all video tapes of films in which Lance play as an extra, from Eddy's (Tony Nardi) video store. (He never plays any "speaking parts"). Lance notices a film script in a hotel room and decides to leave his acting resumé in the room, whose occupant turns out to be a screenwriter Clara (Gabrielle Rose) for a forthcoming television movie based on the true story of her deceased brother and herself. Clara recommends Lance to play the lead and the two begin an affair. She becomes increasingly distraught as it becomes evident that the movie's producer (David Hemblen) is changing the story which is very personal to Clara. As the film progresses towards the end, the inner worlds of Lance, Lisa and Clara and the tangle of relationships start to unravel

Cast 
 Michael McManus ... as Lance
 Arsinée Khanjian... as Lisa
 Gabrielle Rose ... as Clara
 Tony Nardi ... as Eddy
 David Hemblen ... as Producer
 Patricia Collins ... as Housekeeper

References

External links
 
 

1989 films
Canadian drama films
Canadian independent films
English-language Canadian films
Films directed by Atom Egoyan
Films set in Toronto
Films scored by Mychael Danna
1980s English-language films
1980s Canadian films